Breast cancer diagnosis and treatment is influenced by different cultural backgrounds. Factors include differences in beliefs, attitudes, and treatment options that impact diverse populations throughout the world.

Breast cancer and spirituality 
A patient's spirituality is so important that the National Health Society in Scotland requires boards to have a spiritual care policy for patients. This is often overlooked by health care providers. In studies it shows there is a positive correlation with religion or spirituality and women with breast cancer.  Many African-American women have a positive correlation with religion and how it adds to their quality of life. They often have faith in their religious practices, belief in God, support system of family and friends to find meaning and purpose.

In Chile, women's spirituality is important and showed it through prayer, perceived dependence on God to intercede and guide them through this time in their life. They also had social support from their faith communities. Muslim women view their diagnoses as a will of God. They were also active in getting the medical treatment they needed. These women's quality of life was linked with their spiritual meaning.

Women often use their religion or spirituality to help them frame their diagnoses in a new way that provides meaning and purpose. Health care providers can benefit by knowing the role spirituality plays in these women's life, there will be a better awareness of the supporting networks these women need to help cope with their diagnoses. Providers will also be more sensitive to how they make meaning of their cancer, and this will help providers recognize and respond to their patient's spiritual experiences. This will open new doors for a greater empathic care.

Screening among women with intellectual disabilities 
Despite the fact that governments have passed policies and an outreach to provide equal access to healthcare and screenings open, women who are intellectually disabled have lower rates of receiving mammography than the general population. A study was done to find out reasons why women were still not taking advantage of the screenings that are now available to them.
 	
A group of women in Ireland had recently received a mammography; they were interviewed to see what they knew about breast cancer, signs or symptoms, if they had read any material prior to their screening or how they could help prevent breast cancer from occurring. The sample of women had little knowledge in any of these areas. The women explained that their experience was positive but prior to going into their screening they had feelings of fear, anxiety and stress because they did not know what to expect. These factors of a low level of awareness and the fear of the unknown are barriers that prevent women from going to get screenings . There are three things that healthcare providers can do to break down these barriers.
 Women need to have access to material and resources to inform them about the importance of screenings and basic facts about breast cancer.
 When women go to get a mammography it is important for providers to explain the procedure and what it means. It can't be assumed that women already know.
 Nurses and staff need to provide emotional support to women before, during and after the procedure. This will help relieve any embarrassment, stress, fear or anxiety that they might feel.

Treatment options by region

China 
Breast cancer is a particularly good market to highlight the differences in the treatment practices between Western countries and China. This is despite the fact that the incidence of breast cancer in China was approximately 215,600 patients in 2011, which compares closely to the incidence in the United States of America. Even with the high incidence, there has been a lack of emphasis on diagnosis and detection of breast cancer in its early stages.

In Western countries, there are many resources available for patient education and awareness of breast cancer detection as well as many therapeutic options. In China, the majority of breast cancer patients are diagnosed with Stage III/IV disease, which contrasts with Western countries, where patients are more likely to be diagnosed in the early stages. Proper diagnosis is not the only limiting factor. Patients with well-defined disease (HER2- positive) struggle with the ability to gain access to traditional chemotherapeutic options that are considered the standard of care for their Western counterparts.

The other issue most often seen in emerging markets is lack of treatment options as patients relapse following their first line of therapy. In China, only about 40% of metastatic breast cancer patients who receive first-line therapy will go on to receive a second line of therapy. The situation gets dire in third-line, where only one-quarter of patients will receive third-line therapy. Fourth- and fifth-line therapies are virtually non-existent in China. These reported frequencies of later lines of chemotherapy among Chinese patients are significantly lower than those in Japan and the United States, where 80% of patients continue to second-line and 65% of those patients continue to third-line. The main reasons for low use of later-line treatments are the lack of good therapeutic options and the financial burden of more expensive drugs. As their disease progresses, patients are more likely to turn to traditional Chinese medicine.

Middle East 
The Middle East tends to have younger patients with breast cancer in comparison to the rest of the world. In Lebanon, for example, 50 percent of breast cancer patients are below the age of 50 - this compares to 25 percent in the United States and Europe. Breast cancer rates in the Middle East are actually lower than in the western world. Most recent statistics show that in 2012, there were 99,000 cases of breast cancer reported across the Middle East, North Africa, and parts of Central Asia combined, whereas the European Union had 367,000 cases, and the US, 1,677,000.

Nevertheless, mortality rates in the Arab world are much higher. According to the World Health Organization, this is because the region lacks a culture of regular breast cancer screening and therefore, early detection of the disease. The result is that many cases of breast cancer are presented to medical professionals at a late, and usually critical, stage. Remarkably in Jordan, 70 percent of breast cancer cases are first presented at advanced stages. While both the Lebanese and Jordanian governments have programs that fund aspects of cancer care, the expensive cost that develops over the long course of treatment is another concern for women. Lebanon's Ministry of Health will pay for up to 85 percent of treatment costs, but this still leaves families having to cover the remainder, which can be incredibly high. Moreover, regional instability and an influx of displaced people into Lebanon and Jordan have put immense pressure on the countries' healthcare systems.

Despite these challenges, many say that awareness campaigns are having a positive impact in the region. Every October, for example, Jordan and Lebanon run workshops to teach women about the importance of self- and clinical examinations.

South Africa 

Considering that breast cancer is the number one cancer among women in South Africa, its early detection may have reduced mortality in recent years. According to the Cancer Association of South Africa (CASA), the lifetime risk is 1:33. However, South Africa does not have an official breast cancer screening program. So how did the first Siemens Mammomat Inspiration prime mammography system for clinical use find its way to a city in South Africa? This may not seem so far-fetched once you have witnessed the multi-disciplinary approach to breast imaging followed by Capital Radiology in Pretoria. There, a range of specialists, radiologists, radiographers, surgeons, radiation and medical oncologists work together with one aim: breast health. The private practice is situated at the Little Company of Mary Hospital (LCM) in Groenkloof, a suburb of Pretoria.

The hospital first opened its doors in 1957 and is currently one of 63 healthcare facilities across the country owned by the Life HealthCare network. Capital Radiology has a state-of-the-art suite in the Women's Health Department of LCM, and also provides general radiology services to the hospital and its patients. Every month literally hundreds of women walk through the practice's doors to be screened for breast cancer. Patients are sometimes even referred by general practitioners in other provinces of South Africa. Apart from the newest mammography system, they also have the first Mammomat Inspiration and the first ACUSON S2000TM ABVS (Automated Breast Volume Scanner) in Africa. These are complemented by a 1.5-tesla MAGNETOM Symphony magnetic resonance imaging (MRI) system.

Mammography can detect small, early-stage tumors that cannot be felt by touch. In particular, it detects micro-calcifications that may indicate tissue changes and a preliminary form of cancer. While mammography is still the standard diagnostic tool for detecting breast cancer in its early stages, the radiographers at Capital Radiology also use ultrasound, which is especially helpful in assessing dense breast tissue. If a mammography or ultrasound exam shows a suspected cancer, biopsies are carried out under either stereotactic mammography guidance or ultrasound guidance. A multidisciplinary team of surgeons, oncologists, and pathologists then decide about the treatment path, possibly involving other modalities such as MRI, computed tomography, and, in some cases PET-CT, in this process.

References

Breast cancer